During the Fascist rule in Italy, a gerarca (plural: gerarchi) was a higher officer of the National Fascist Party (PNF).

The highest gerarchi, up to the Federal Secretary, were members of the National Council of the PNF and of the Chamber of Fasces and Corporations. The secretary and members of the National Directorate of the PNF were members of the Grand Council of Fascism. 

A Ras (from the homonymous Ethiopian title) was a gerarca dominating in one province. So, for example, Italo Balbo was the Ras of Ferrara, and Roberto Farinacci the Ras of Cremona.

References

External links

Italian Fascism
Italian words and phrases